Giuseppe Zucchinetti (20 November 1924 – 15 May 2009) was an Italian sailor who competed in the 1968 Summer Olympics.

References

External links
 

1924 births
2009 deaths
Italian male sailors (sport)
Olympic sailors of Italy
Sailors at the 1968 Summer Olympics – 5.5 Metre